The Ford Mustang Mach-E is a battery electric compact crossover SUV produced by Ford. The vehicle was introduced on November 17, 2019, and went on sale in December 2020 as a 2021 model. The vehicle uses the Mustang nameplate, with a Mach-E moniker which is inspired by the Mach 1 variant of the first-generation Mustang. The car won the 2021 North American SUV of the Year Award.

Overview 

During development, the Mustang Mach-E was originally teased as the Ford Mach 1, but was retracted after strong public opposition, with Ford CEO Jim Farley describing the name tease as an evaluation.

Conventional door handles are absent on the Mustang Mach-E, and the vehicle instead features buttons that pop open the doors and a small door handle protruding from the front doors. Owners can use their smartphones as a key as well as a keypad built into the B-pillar.

The interior has a wide dashboard and built-in soundbar; the dash is equipped with a vertically mounted  touchscreen infotainment system with a rotary dial fixed onto it. The majority of the car's systems are controlled through the screen, which uses Ford's recent SYNC 4 operating system that can accept wireless updates. A  digital cluster for the driver is also featured, while the steering wheel retains a number of physical buttons.

The Mustang Mach-E is built on the Global Electrified 1 (GE1) platform, which is a heavily reworked version of the C2 platform that is used on the fourth generation Focus and third generation Kuga/fourth generation Escape.

Charging is available via an AC home charger or DC fast chargers at up to 150 kW.

Trim levels 

In the U.S., the Mustang Mach-E is available in four distinct trim levels: base Select, mid-level California Route 1 Edition, well-equipped Premium, and performance-oriented GT. A limited-production First Edition trim was also available at launch for the 2021 model year, and was based on the Premium trim. A GT Performance Package is also available for the GT trim.

The model was launched with two battery pack sizes and three power outputs. The entry-level rear-wheel drive version is offered with either a 68 kWh battery pack driving a  motor or an 88 kWh extended battery pack driving a  motor. Both battery packs have a claimed  time of 6.1 seconds or less and an EPA range of around  respectively. Both the SR and the ER models use the same Motors the output difference is due to the power from the battery. The larger  motor is used in the rear of all models with the smaller  motor used in the front of the AWD models (Select and Premium). The GT Performance gets the same  motor in both front and rear.

A dual-motor all-wheel-drive version is also offered with either the same 68 kWh battery pack driving a  motor, or the 88 kWh extended battery pack driving a  motor. Car and Driver achieved a  time of 5.1 seconds with the extended-range model.

Edmunds learned through their testing that the Mach-E GT's peak acceleration is curtailed after 5 seconds of hard acceleration, which Ford also confirmed. The GT trim's Unbridled Extend Mode attempts to ameliorate this limitation by increasing cooling and limiting peak motor output.

The Mach E-GT Performance Edition was revealed in December 2, 2020. It is equipped with 20" alloy wheels with Pirelli tires, red Brembo calipers, and black accents on the bodywork. Priced at US$60,000, it launched at US showrooms in summer 2021.

Specifications

Special variants

Mustang Mach-E 1400 

The Ford Mustang Mach-E 1400 is a test-bed prototype, first tested by Vaughn Gittin Jr., developed in over 10,000 hours of collaboration between RTR Vehicles and Ford Performance. It is made mostly from composite fiber, saving more weight over carbon fiber. The power of each electric motor can be adjusted individually within very small margins, and could allow for switching between all-wheel drive, rear-wheel drive, and front-wheel drive. Regenerative braking is achieved through an electric booster system, accompanied by ABS and stability control to optimize the braking system. The electric prototype also contains Brembo brakes like the Ford Mustang GT4 racecar. The public debut will occur at a NASCAR race, serving as a test-bed for new materials.

Mustang Mach-E GT Service Vehicles 
In December 2021, New York City announced it was buying 184 Mustang Mach-E SUVs as emergency vehicles. During 2022 these vehicles would replace gasoline-powered cars already in use.

Marketing 
Ford hired British actor Idris Elba (who once worked for Ford of Britain along with his father) to star in several teaser commercials for the car and host the Mustang Mach-E's official debut on November 17, 2019.

On July 9, 2021, Paul Clifton, Kevin Booker, and Fergal McGrath set a Guinness World Record by driving from John O'Groats to Land's End. They covered the  route with three charges. Later, a team consisting of Booker, McGrath, and Adam Wood beat this record with one charge stop of 43 minutes 13 seconds, gaining an additional two Guinness World Records.

Production 
Unlike the internal combustion engine (ICE) Mustang models, the Mach-E is not assembled in the United States. Rather, the final assembly point is Cuautitlán Assembly in Cuautitlán Izcalli, Mexico. According to former Ford CEO Jim Hackett, assembling the vehicle in Mexico allows Ford to make a profit from the first vehicle, unlike other electric vehicles. He also stated that as Ford develops factory capacity for electric vehicle production in the United States, some production may be moved there.

In February 2021, Ford announced that the vehicle would be produced in China by the Changan Ford joint venture for the Chinese domestic market in order to penetrate the nation's electric vehicle market.

In April 2022, Ford stopped accepting new orders for the 2022 model year Mustang Mach E due to its popularity.

In June 2022, the CFO of Ford Motor announced that the profitability of the Mustang Mach-E has been wiped out due to increases in the cost of raw materials.

On August 30, 2022, Ford started accepting orders for the 2023 Mach Es with significant price increases.  The price increase will return the Mach E to profitability for Ford.

Significant recalls 
In May 2022, Ford initiated a select recall for 2021 Mach-E AWD models over "an issue with unintended acceleration, deceleration, and/or a loss of power" resulting from functional safety software failing to detect a software error during operation leading to unintended acceleration, unintended deceleration, or a loss of drive power.

Safety 
The 2021 Mustang Mach-E top trim was awarded the "Top Safety Pick" by the Insurance Institute for Highway Safety.

Awards 
In 2021, the Mustang Mach-E won Car and Drivers first "EV of the Year" award. It was up against 10 other vehicles including three Tesla models, Audi e-tron, Volvo XC40 Recharge, and Porsche Taycan. All vehicles were tested on how far they could travel at 70 miles-per-hour, performance tests, subjective feel tests on public roads and finally a 1,000-mile road trip from Michigan to Virginia and back. The magazine stated that: "The Mach-E has the driving dynamics and design to push new buyers past mere acceptance of EVs to excitement." They also made note of the premium materials and build quality in their scoring.

Sales

References

External links 

 

Mustang Mach-E
Cars introduced in 2019
2020s cars
Compact sport utility vehicles
Crossover sport utility vehicles
Rear-wheel-drive vehicles
All-wheel-drive vehicles
Production electric cars